Michael Davidson may refer to:

 Michael Davidson (poet) (born 1944), American poet
 Michael Davidson (singer) (born 1963), singer and songwriter
 Michael Davidson (journalist) (1897–1976), English journalist, memoirist and pederast
 Michael Davidson (cricketer, born 1970), former English cricketer
 Michael Davidson (cricketer, born 1981), New Zealand cricketer
 Michael Davidson (cricketer, born 1992), New Zealand cricketer
 Michael W. Davidson (1950–2015), American microscopist
 Mike Davidson (born 1963), former freestyle swimmer from New Zealand
 Michael C. Davidson (died 2015), captain of the SS El Faro

See also
 Michael Davison (disambiguation)